Bruno Boscherie (born 22 February 1951 in Carpentras) is a French fencer who took part in the 1980 Olympic Games in Moscow.

Boscherie was trained by Ernest Revenu in Melun, along with teammates Daniel Revenu, Bernard Talvard, Hugues Leseur, Daniel Provost, Jacky Courtillat and Frédéric Pietruszka.

Boscherie became Olympic fencing champion at the 1980 Summer Olympics in Moscow. He was part of the French team which won team gold in the foil ahead of the Soviet Union and Poland. The others in the team were Pascal Jolyot, Philippe Bonin, Didier Flament and Frédéric Pietruszka.

Olympic medals
 1980  Moscow -  Gold in fencing, team foil  France

References

1951 births
Living people
People from Carpentras
French male foil fencers
Olympic fencers of France
Fencers at the 1980 Summer Olympics
Olympic gold medalists for France
Olympic medalists in fencing
Medalists at the 1980 Summer Olympics
Sportspeople from Vaucluse
20th-century French people